Indomito was the name of at least three ships of the Italian Navy and may refer to:

 , an  launched in 1912 and discarded in 1937.
 , a  launched in 1943. Transferred to Yugoslavia and renamed Triglav in 1949.
 , an  launched in 1958 and decommissioned in 1980.

Italian Navy ship names